Deep Dive is a Canadian radio program, which airs on CBC Radio One. Hosted by Rich Terfy, the program showcases famous record albums of various genres, which are played in their entirety with various anecdotes told between tracks.

The program premiered in July 2021 as a short-run summer series, to replace Vinyl Tap starring Randy Bachmann, and was then subsequently scheduled for the network's regular schedule.

External links

CBC Music programs
Canadian music radio programs
2021 radio programme debuts
CBC Radio One programs